Greeks of the Sea,  is a TV documentary which was screened on SBS ONE in Australia from 19 July to 2 August 2014 as a three one-hour episode series.  The documentary was filmed in the Greek Islands in 2013.  The TV documentary series is about the Greek's relationship with the sea. It is presented by Greek-Australian filmmaker Nikos Andronicos who travels from mainland Greece to 15 Islands of the Aegean Sea to hear the stories of fishermen, boat builders, divers, naval officers, ship-owners and others, whom he meets.

The series covers the maritime prowess of the Greeks.Kings of the Oceans 1961-1966 Ships built for the Hellenes by George M Foustanos The series is also available in an international version of six half-hour episodes as listed in the Episode guide.

 Production 
Greeks of the Sea was produced by an all Australian team. The Australian version is a series consisting of three one-hour episodes, produced especially for and in association with SBS Australia. The international version is a series of six 30 minute episodes. The series was originally devised and filmed under the working title of Greek Seadogs. It was produced by Greek Seadogs & Tadpole Studios in association with SBS Australia in 2014.

Episodes

References

External links 
 Neos Kosmos Article - Stories from the Sea - 14 March 2013
 Greek Reporter (Australia) Article - Greek Seadogs TV Series for Aussies - 26 March 2013
 Travelling News (Greece's travel & tourism newspaper) - 2 August 2013
 Neos Kosmos Article - Smooth Sailing for Greek Seadogs - 13 August 2013
 Newcastle Herald Article - TOPICS: Port's Greek guests - 11 March 2014
 Neos Kosmos Article - Greeks of the sea - 23 June 2014
 SBS One Screening Information - July 2014
 TV Tonight - Australia's leading TV blog - Blog: Airdate Greeks of the Sea - 3 July 2014
 Neos Kosmos Press Release Article - "Greeks of the Sea" launched in Athens - 4 July 2014
 Mosman Daily, Australian Local Newspaper Article - 10 July 2014
 mygreecetravelblog.com - Blog: Greeks of the sea television show debuts Down Under -12 July 2014
 tvweeklogieawards.com.au Article - Saturday's Pick : Greeks of the Sea - 17 July 2014
 Neos Kosmos Article - 'Filoxenia' of Greek sea dogs - 17 July 2014
 Screening Listing on SBS ONE Australia - 19 July 2014
 TVCatchupAustralia.com - August 2014
 C21 Media Distributor - International Publishing Company - 2015
 Official Website

2010s Australian documentary television series
Television series about Greece
2014 Australian television series debuts
2014 Australian television series endings